Stochastica is a moth genus in the subfamily Autostichinae. It contains the species Stochastica virgularia, which is found in China (Yunnan).

References

Autostichinae
Moths described in 1938